Iran-e Bastan, also known as Nameh-ye Iran Bastan, was a Persian language weekly political and news magazine which was published in Tehran, Iran, in the period 1933–1937. The publication is known for its pro-Nazi and anti-imperialist political stance.

History and profile  
Iran-e Bastan was first published on 21 January 1933 and edited by a Nazi sympathiser Persian journalist Abdulrahman Saif Azad who was also the founder and license holder of the magazine. The magazine was published in Tehran on a weekly basis. It enjoyed significant financial support from Persians during its early years. Germans also sponsored Iran-e Bastan It is also reported the that the magazine was directly published by the Nazi Ministry of Propaganda and that the real editor was a member of the Nazi Party, Major von Vibran.

Iran-e Bastan featured news and frequently published articles praising the ancient civilizations of Persia which were used to support anti-imperialism. The magazine also covered news about the achievements of Nazi Germany in the fields of science and technology. Due to its increasing pro-Nazi stance the magazine lost the financial support from Persians. Iran-e Bastan folded in 1937 when Abdulrahman Saif Azad left Iran for Europe. Following World War II he returned to Iran and restarted Iran-e Bastan in 1947, but he could not manage to continue its publication.

References

1933 establishments in Iran
1937 disestablishments in Iran
Defunct magazines published in Iran
Defunct political magazines
Fascist newspapers and magazines
Magazines established in 1933
Magazines disestablished in 1937
Magazines published in Tehran
Persian-language magazines
News magazines published in Asia
Propaganda newspapers and magazines
Weekly magazines published in Iran
Pahlavi Iran